Tieghemella is a genus of the plant family Sapotaceae described as a genus in 1890. The wood of Tieghemella species is known as makore in the lumber trade.

Tieghemella is native to western and central Africa.

Species
 Tieghemella africana  - Ivory Coast, Cameroon, Republic of the Congo, Gabon, Democratic Republic of the Congo
 Tieghemella heckelii  - Guinea, Liberia, Sierra Leone, Ivory Coast, Nigeria, Democratic Republic of the Congo

References

 
Flora of Africa
Sapotaceae genera
Taxonomy articles created by Polbot